The 2005 World Weightlifting Championships were held in Doha, Qatar from 9 November to 17 November. The women's +75 kilograms division was staged on 15 November 2005.

Schedule

Medalists

Records

Results

References
Weightlifting World Championships Seniors Statistics, Page 55 
Results 

2005 World Weightlifting Championships
World